This is a list of newspapers in Rhode Island.

 Daily newspapers This is a list of all daily newspapers in Rhode Island. For weeklies, please see List of newspapers in Rhode Island.
The Boston Globe (Rhode Island) of Boston, owned by Boston Globe Media Partners, via their Providence-based bureau, covering all of Rhode Island
The Brown Daily Herald of Providence, owned independently, covering Brown University
The Call of Woonsocket, owned by RISN Operations, covering northern Providence County
Kent County Daily Times of West Warwick, owned by RISN Operations, covering most of Kent County
The Newport Daily News of Newport, owned by GateHouse Media, covering most of Newport County
The Providence Journal of Providence, owned by GateHouse Media, covering all of Rhode Island
The Times of Pawtucket, owned by RISN Operations, covering eastern Providence County
The Westerly Sun of Westerly, owned by RISN Operations, covering western Washington County Weekly newspapers (by owner) 

Monthly or bi-monthly newspapers
Jewish Rhode Island, published monthly and owned by the Jewish Alliance of Greater Rhode Island. Based in Providence, but covering the entire state.
Mercury, published monthly and owned by Gatehouse Media. An alternative weekly-style paper covering arts, entertainment and food in Newport and Middletown.

Defunct

Newport
Newspapers published in Newport, Rhode Island:

 The Companion; and Commercial Centinel. W., May 2-Sept. 8, 1798.
 Gazette Francoise. W., Nov. 17, 1780-Jan. 2, 1781.
 The Guardian Of Liberty. W., Oct. 3-Dec. 27, 1800+
 The Newport Gazette. W., Jan. 16, 1777-Oct. 6, 1779.
 The Newport Herald. W., Mar. 1, 1787-Sept. 17, 1791.
 The Newport Mercury. W., S.W, Jan. 30, 1759-Dec. 30, 1800+
 The Newport Mercury, Or, The Weekly Advertiser. W., June 19, 1758-Jan. 23, 1759.
 The Rhode-Island Gazette. W., Sept. 27, 1732- Mar. 24, 1733.
 Rhode Island Museum. W., July 7-Dec. 29, 1794.
 Weekly Companion. W., Apr. 27-July 20, 1799.
 Weekly Companion; and the Commercial Centinel. W., Sept. 15, 1798-Apr. 20, 1799.

Providence
Newspapers published in Providence, Rhode Island:

 The American Journal and General Advertiser. W., S.W., Mar. 18, 1779-Aug. 29, 1781.

 Manufacturers and Farmer's Journal, Semiweekly, May 1, 1848-Dec. 30, 1907
 The Providence Gazette. W., Jan. 10, 1795-Dec. 27, 1800+
 The Providence Gazette, and Country Journal. W., Oct. 20, 1762-Jan. 3, 1795.
 The Providence Journal, and Town and Country Advertiser. W., Jan. 2, 1799-Dec. 31, 1800+
 State Gazette, and Town and Country Advertiser. S.W., Jan. 4-July 2, 1796.
 The United States Chronicle. W., Feb. 21, 1793- Dec. 25, 1800+
 The United States Chronicle: Political, Commercial, Historical. W., Jan. 1, 1784-Feb. 14, 1793.
 The Providence Phoenix, 1978 - Oct. 17, 2014

Warren
Newspapers published in Warren, Rhode Island:

 Herald of the United States. W., Jan. 14, 1792-Dec. 26, 1800+

See also
Media in Rhode Island
List of African-American newspapers in Rhode Island

References

Further reading